David Brevik (born February 14, 1968)  is an American video game designer, producer and programmer who served as the co-founder and president of Blizzard North. He is best known for the critically acclaimed Diablo franchise. Currently he serves as game designer and founder of his independent studio, Graybeard Games.

Biography

Early life
Brevik was born in Madison, Wisconsin, United States.  He was educated at California State University, Chico from 1986 to 1991.

Career
Following his position as lead technical director at Iguana Entertainment, Brevik left to form Condor / Blizzard North, holding a position as president of the company from September 1993 to 2003. GameSpot named him as 1996's fourth most influential person in computer gaming for his role in the inception and development of Diablo.

Brevik resigned from Blizzard and co-founded Flagship Studios (in 2003) as well as Ping0 (in 2006), a sister company to Flagship Studios. After the company dissolved it was announced that he was appointed new creative director for Turbine and its new West coast studio.

In 2009, David Brevik began at Gazillion Entertainment in San Mateo, California working in the Gargantuan Studio. In 2011, Gargantuan became Secret Identity Studios and David Brevik was named president and chief operating officer of Gazillion Entertainment. Eventually he was promoted to Chief Executive Officer of Gazillion Entertainment in 2013. He left the company to pursue "other opportunities" on January 6, 2016. As of October 18, 2016, Brevik has been working as an advisor on the Chinese release of Path of Exile for Grinding Gear Games.

After leaving Gazillion, Brevik founded an indie studio called Graybeard Games. In May of 2019, Graybeard Games released an action role-playing video game titled It Lurks Below.

In 2016, Brevik revealed that he was once approached by Sabeer Bhatia in 1996 to form an email company in which he will get 10% of the shares. Brevik flatly rejected the offer, thinking it was the "stupidest idea." 14 months later, when the  company, later known as Hotmail, sold for $400 million, Brevik expressed his regret over that decision, calling it the "worst business decision of my entire career."

Brevik and Bill Wang, a former employee of Perfect World Entertainment, announced the formation of Skystone Games in May 2020, a publishing and development studio aimed to help smaller indie studios with multiplatform releases.

Works 
 Gordo 106 (1993) – Programmer
 Aero the Acro-Bat (1993) – Programmer
 NBA Jam (1993) – Programmer
 Justice League Task Force (1995) – Programmer
 Diablo (1997) – Lead Programmer, Senior Designer
 Diablo II (2000) – Project and Design Lead
 Warcraft III: Reign of Chaos (2002) – Additional Game Review
 Hellgate: London (2007) – Game Visionary, Lead Programmer, Story Editor
 Dungeons & Dragons Online: Eberron Unlimited (2009) – Creative Director
 Marvel Heroes (2013) – Creator
 The Nonomancer (2016) – Creator
 It Lurks Below (2018) – Creator

References

Bibliography

External links

Diablo made me do it - 1UP.com interview
Hellgate: London Interview - StrategyInformer interview
Diablo 2 Designer Diaries - GameSpot interview
Lead Creator - Blue's News Turbine expansion
About David Brevik - Graybeard Games website

American video game designers
California State University, Chico alumni
Living people
Place of birth missing (living people)
Video game producers
1968 births
Blizzard Entertainment people
American video game programmers